Seabrook is a suburb in Melbourne, Victoria, Australia,  south-west of Melbourne's Central Business District, located within the City of Hobsons Bay local government area. Seabrook recorded a population of 4,952 at the 2021 census.

Facilities

The suburb has a small shopping area with some take-away food stores and a Ampol service station located on Point Cook Road and Mintaro Way. Seabrook Primary School also serves the area for education. Although a public school, Seabrook Primary School ranks amongst the top schools in the state of Victoria. Seabrook Primary School has been an International Baccalaureate (IB) World School since September 2011 and it is authorised to offer the IB Primary Years Programme.

Transport

Bus
 Route 496: Laverton Station to Sanctuary Lakes
 Route 498: Laverton Station to Hoppers Crossing station
 Route 944: City to Point Cook (Night Bus Service)

Notable people
 Cecil Exum
 Dante Exum
 Connor Menadue

Gallery

See also
 City of Werribee – Seabrook was previously within this former local government area.

References

External links
Hobsons Bay Community Online Forum

Suburbs of Melbourne
Suburbs of the City of Hobsons Bay